St. Louis Bombers may refer to:
  
 St. Louis Bombers Rugby Football Club
 St. Louis Bombers (NBA), a defunct National Basketball Association team